John Spalding (1763 – 26 August 1815) was a Scottish MP in the British Parliament.

He represented Wigtown Burghs 1796–1803.

He was elected a Fellow of the Royal Society in July 1797.

He married Mary Anne Eden, daughter of Thomas Eden and Mariana Jones, on 19 December 1807; their son was John Eden Spalding. Mary Anne went on to marry Henry Brougham, 1st Baron Brougham and Vaux after his death.

References

1763 births
1815 deaths
British MPs 1796–1800
Fellows of the Royal Society
Members of the Parliament of Great Britain for Scottish constituencies
Members of the Parliament of the United Kingdom for Scottish constituencies
UK MPs 1801–1802
UK MPs 1802–1806